The 2022–23 Women's Championship season (also known as the Barclays Women's Championship for sponsorship reasons) will be the fifth season of the rebranded Women's Championship, the second tier of women's football in England.

Ahead of the season the top two tiers unveiled a new visual identity, dropping "The FA" from the league names as part of the long term strategy for the leagues to be under new ownership in the future. Having sponsored the first tier since the 2019–20 season, it marks the first season of Barclays as the title partner of the Women's Championship.

Teams

Twelve teams will compete in the Championship for the 2022–23 season, the same number as the previous season. Liverpool were promoted to the FA WSL as 2021–22 FA Women's Championship winners. They were replaced by Birmingham City who finished bottom of the FA WSL in the 2021–22 season and were relegated after 20 years in the top flight. Watford were relegated to the FA Women's National League after just one season in the Championship. They were replaced by Southern Premier Division winners Southampton who beat Northern Premier Division winners Wolverhampton Wanderers in the 2021–22 FA Women's National League playoff to earn promotion.

Managerial changes

Table

Results

Positions by round
The table lists the positions of teams after each week of matches. In order to preserve chronological progress, any postponed matches are not included in the round at which they were originally scheduled, but added to the full round they were played immediately afterwards. For example, if a match is scheduled for round 13, but then postponed and played between rounds 16 and 17, it will be added to the standings for round 16.

Results by round

See also
2022–23 FA Women's League Cup
2022–23 Women's Super League (tier 1)
2022–23 FA Women's National League (tier 3 & 4)

References

External links
Official website

Women's Championship (England)
2
Women's Championship